The 22991/22992 Bandra Terminus–Veraval Superfast Express is a Superfast train belonging to Western Railway zone that runs between  and  in India. It is currently being operated with 22991/22992 train numbers on a weekly basis.

Service

22991/Bandra Terminus–Veraval Superfast Express has an average speed of 58 km/hr and covers 914 km in 15h 50m.
22992/Veraval–Bandra Terminus Superfast Express has an average speed of 55 km/hr and covers 914 km in 16h 30m.

Route and halts 

The important halts of the train are:

Schedule

Coach composition

The train has standard LHB rakes with max speed of 130 kmph. The train consists of 16 coaches:

 1 AC II Tier
 1 AC III Tier
 9 Sleeper coaches
 3 General Unreserved
 2 End-on Generator

Traction

Both trains are hauled by a Vadodara Loco Shed based WAP-5 or WAP-4E electric locomotive from Bandra to Ahmedabad. After Ahmedabad, both trains are hauled by a Locomotive shed, Vatva based WDM-3A or WDM-3D diesel locomotives uptil Veraval and vice versa.

Rake sharing

The train shares its rake with 22993/22994 Bandra Terminus–Mahuva Superfast Express and 22989/22990 Bandra Terminus–Mahuva Superfast Express.

See also 

 Veraval Junction railway station
 Bandra Terminus railway station

Notes

References

External links 

 22991/Bandra Terminus - Veraval Superfast Express India Rail Info
 22992/Veraval - Bandra Terminus Superfast Express India Rail Info

Transport in Mumbai
Transport in Veraval
Express trains in India
Rail transport in Maharashtra
Rail transport in Gujarat
Railway services introduced in 2017